Peter Endrulat (born 10 August 1954 in the Weidenau) is a former German footballer.

After coming through the ranks of his local team VfB 07 Weidenau as a youth, Endrulat moved to FC Schalke 04 in 1973 and made his Bundesliga debut as a 20-year-old for the Gelsenkirchen-based team in a 1–1 draw at home to Eintracht Frankfurt on 10 December 1974. Having played three times for SpVgg Erkenschwick, he later moved to fellow North Rhine-Westphalian club Borussia Dortmund where he was the second choice goalkeeper to Horst Bertram. When Bertram was injured in 1978, Endrulat had the chance to prove himself between the posts, and played quite well towards the end of the season. However, on the final day of the 1977–78 Bundesliga campaign, having only been told the morning before the game that his contract would not be extended close-season, Borussia Dortmund travelled to the Rheinstadion in Düsseldorf for a match against Borussia Mönchengladbach. By half-time of his sixth game in Dortmund colours, Endrulat had already conceded six goals, and his coach Otto Rehhagel asked him if he would like to be substituted, but he said he had no problem with playing on. Endrulat later concluded however that this had been the wrong decision:

After 90 minutes, Borussia Mönchengladbach had put 12 goals past Endrulat for the all-time record Bundesliga victory. This proved to be Endrulat's last game in Germany's top flight as his contract was not extended.  He played out the rest of his career for Tennis Borussia Berlin in the 2. Bundesliga Nord, where he made a total of 60 appearances.

References

External links 
 

1954 births
Living people
Sportspeople from Siegen
German footballers
Association football goalkeepers
Bundesliga players
2. Bundesliga players
FC Schalke 04 players
Borussia Dortmund players
Tennis Borussia Berlin players
SpVgg Erkenschwick players
Footballers from North Rhine-Westphalia